is a Japanese anime television series that aired in 1978 and 1979 in Japan and in the mid-1980s in Europe, Mexico, South America & Arab World countries, based on Robert Louis Stevenson's 1883 novel of the same name. In 2013, the 1987 movie compilation was dubbed in English by Bang Zoom! Entertainment and available on the North American Hulu, but has since been removed. However, as of early 2016, TMS has made the compilation movie available to watch on YouTube for free.

Characters

Main characters
Jim Hawkins: The main protagonist. In this version, he is depicted as a 13-year-old boy with a pet leopard cub named Benbow. He is often energetic and greatly admires Silver at first; but as the series progresses, he often tries to mask his confusion with Silver with anger, but can't truly bring himself to hate the man. When Redruth gets killed, he is forced to face reality as it truly is.
Long John Silver: The main antagonist. The cook on the voyage to Treasure Island. Silver is the secret ringleader of the pirate band. His physical and emotional strength is impressive. Silver is deceitful and disloyal, greedy and visceral, and does not care about human relations. Yet he is always kind toward Jim and genuinely fond of the boy. Silver is a powerful mixture of charisma and self-destructiveness, individualism and recklessness.
Gray: He is almost incited to mutiny, but remains loyal to the Squire's side when asked to do so by Captain Smollett. He is very skilled with knife. He is from Ireland.
Papy: Light-headed young pirate who often panics and doesn't have his own view. He is scared of John Silver.
Smollett: The captain of the voyage to Treasure Island. Captain Smollett is savvy and is rightly suspicious of the crew Trelawney has hired.
Livesey: The local doctor and judge. Dr. Livesey is wise and practical, and Jim respects but is not inspired by him. Livesey exhibits common sense and rational thought while on the island, and his idea to send Ben to spook the pirates reveals a deep understanding of human nature. He is fair-minded, magnanimously agreeing to treat the pirates with just as much care as his own wounded men.
Ben Gunn: A former member of Flint's crew who became half insane after being marooned for three years on Treasure Island, having convinced another ship's crew that he was capable of finding Flint's treasure. Helps Jim by giving him the location of his homemade boat and scares the mutineers with his voice.
Joyce: One of the manservants of Squire Trelawney, he accompanies him to the island. He is shot through the head and killed by a mutineer during an attack on the stockade.
Hunter: The other manservant of Squire Trelawney. He also accompanies him to the island.
Trelawney: A local Bristol nobleman. Trelawney arranges the voyage to the island to find the treasure. He is associated with civic authority and social power, as well as with the comforts of civilized country life (his name suggests both "trees" and "lawn"). He often acts childish during situations.
Redruth: The gamekeeper of Squire Trelawney, he accompanies the Squire to the island but is shot and killed by the mutineers during an attack on the stockade.
Arrow: The first mate of the Hispaniola. He drinks despite there being a rule about no alcohol on board and is useless as a first mate. He mysteriously disappears before they get to the island.

Plot summary
Jim Hawkins is a young boy led by progressive events to embark on a search journey for the legendary treasure of the once dreaded pirate, Captain Flint. on their way to Treasure Island, John Silver, Jim's best friend (and eventually father-figure), takeover command of the ship revealing his true self as the ruthless pirate who was once the right hand of Flint himself. Feeling betrayed, now Jim has to deal with his mixed emotions and face Silver who still consider himself and Jim as friends.

Cast

Note: There are some differences between the Japanese cast of the TV series and the movie

References

External links

1978 anime television series debuts
Madhouse (company)
TMS Entertainment
Television series based on Treasure Island
Pirates in anime and manga